"Get Get Down" is a song by American DJ and producer Paul Johnson. It was released in September 1999 as a single from his 1999 album The Groove I Have. "Get Get Down" topped the US Billboard Hot Dance/Club Play chart and peaked within the top 10 of the charts of France, Greece, the Netherlands, the United Kingdom, and Wallonia.

Track listings

US CD single
 "Get Get Down" (original mix)
 "Get Get Down" (Latin Excursion mix)
 "Get Get Down" (dancefloor dub)
 "Get Get Down" (Sounds of Life Cariola mix)
 "Get Get Down" (Choo Choo's Digital Pimp mix)
 "Get Get Down" (Conga Squad Turbulance mix)
 "Get Get Down" (Get Get Nerio's Dubwork mix)
 "Get Get Down" (Billy Lo's Friday Night Ruffneck Vision remix)

US 12-inch single
A1. "Get Get Down" (the dance floor dub)
B1. "Get Get Down" (Latin Excursion mix)
B2. "Get Get Down" (Get Get Nerio's Dubwork mix)

Australian and New Zealand CD single
 "Get Get Down" (radio edit)
 "Get Get Down" (Choo Choo's Subcriminal mix)
 "Get Get Down" (Choo Choo's Digital Pimp mix)
 "Get Get Down" (original version)
 "Get Get Down" (Sounds of Life Cariola mix)
 "Get Get Down" (XXX remix) – 5:28

UK CD1
 "Get Get Down" (original mix)
 "Get Get Down" (Choo Choo's Subcriminal mix)
 "Get Get Down" (dancefloor dub)

UK CD2
 "Get Get Down" (Latin Excursion mix)
 "Get Get Down" (Sounds of Life dub mix)
 "Get Get Down" (XXX remix)

UK 12-inch single
A1. "Get Get Down" (original mix)
AA1. "Get Get Down" (Choo Choo's Subcriminal mix)
AA2. "Get Get Down" (Choo Choo's Digital Pimp mix)

UK cassette single
A1. "Get Get Down" (original mix)
B1. "Get Get Down" (XXX remix)
B2. "Get Get Down" (Choo Choo's Subcriminal mix)

French CD single
 "Get Get Down" (original radio) – 3:09
 "Get Get Down" (XXX remix) – 5:28

Charts

Weekly charts

Year-end charts

Certifications

See also
 List of number-one dance singles of 1999 (U.S.)

References

External links
 Facebook page
 YouTube video

1999 singles
1999 songs